Alan William Cocks (born 7 May 1951) is an English retired professional footballer who played as a forward in the Football League for Southport and Brentford.

Personal life 
Cocks attended Ormskirk Grammar School.

Career statistics

References

1951 births
English footballers
English Football League players
Brentford F.C. players
Living people
People from Burscough
Association football forwards
Chelsea F.C. players
Southport F.C. players
Great Harwood F.C. players
Skelmersdale United F.C. players
Runcorn F.C. Halton players
Northern Premier League players
Burscough F.C. players